Arthur C. Stevenson (May 30, 1916 – September 21, 2000) was a Canadian football running back who played five seasons for the Winnipeg Blue Bombers of the Canadian Football League. He helped the Blue Bombers to Grey Cup championships in 1939 and 1941. Stevenson was inducted into the Canadian Football Hall of Fame in 1969.

References

External links
Profile at Manitoba Sports Hall of Fame

People from Gothenburg, Nebraska
Canadian Football Hall of Fame inductees
American players of Canadian football
Hastings College alumni
Winnipeg Blue Bombers players
Players of American football from Nebraska
1916 births
2000 deaths